Mwika Kusini i s a town and ward in the Moshi Rural district of the Kilimanjaro Region of Tanzania. Mwika kusini ward borders Mwika Kaskazini ward in the north, Rombo district in the east, Makuyuni ward in the south and in the west Marangu Mashariki.

In 2016 the Tanzania National Bureau of Statistics report there were 21,070 people in the ward, from 19,645 in 2012.

Mwika people (Chaga people) prepare their traditional food that they grow. Banana is a staple that produces dishes such as the favorite machalari. Machalari is prepared with banana and meat. Other traditional food includes kiburu, kitawa, mtori, mlaso, ngararimo, kisusio, kimamtine and others of the like, according to nature of crops and animals on the Chaga land.

References

Wards of Kilimanjaro Region